Gulani is a Local Government Area in Yobe State, Nigeria. Its headquarters are in the town of Bara.

It has an area of 2,090 km and a population of 103,510 at the 2006 census.

The postal code of the area is 621.

See also 
 List of Local Government Areas in Yobe State

References

Local Government Areas in Yobe State